Kabuki Wuki is a live album by blues musician John Lee Hooker recorded In California in 1971 and released by the BluesWay label in 1973.

Reception

AllMusic reviewer Mark Allen stated: "This live set at the Kabuki Theater in San Francisco never catches fire. The great bluesman has his usual band, but he seems to be trying too hard to appeal to a young, mostly white audience that ends up too high in the mix".

Track listing
All compositions credited to John Lee Hooker
 "Your Love (Just a Little Bit)" – 5:30	
 "Hold It" – 0:46	
 "Look at the Rain" – 8:33	
 "My Best Friend" – 5:15	
 "Hit the Floor" – 5:48	
 "A Little Bit Higher" – 5:27	
 "I Wonder Why" – 4:50	
 "If You Got a Dollar" – 4:50

Personnel
John Lee Hooker – guitar, vocals
Robert Hooker – organ
Benny Rowe, Luther Tucker, Paul Wood – guitar
Gino Skaggs – bass
Ken Swank – drums
L. C. Robinson – guitar (track 1)

References

John Lee Hooker live albums
1973 live albums
BluesWay Records live albums